Alexander Antonio Viana (born 24 April 1974), commonly known as Carioca, is a retired Brazilian footballer who played for Partizani Tirana in the Albanian Superliga between 2001 and 2005. He became the first foreign player in the Albanian Superliga to score a hattrick and is currently one of two foreign players to have scored multiple hattricks in the league, alongside Croatian striker Pero Pejić.

References

1974 births
Living people
Brazilian footballers
Brazilian expatriate footballers
Brazilian expatriate sportspeople in Albania
Expatriate footballers in Albania
Kategoria Superiore players
FK Partizani Tirana players
Association football midfielders